Paul Greville is a dual player from County Westmeath. He plays both Gaelic football and hurling with Westmeath GAA, and was part of the team that won the Christy Ring Cup. He has received National Hurling League and National Football League medals.

Greville plays club football with Killucan, winning the 2005 intermediate football championship, and club hurling with Raharney GAA, winning Westmeath Senior Hurling Championships in 2006, 2008 and 2010. In 2020 he moved to Derrytresk in Tyrone.
In his maiden season with Derrytresk he was involved in a controversial incident where he was involved in a half-time brawl during an in-house game. This was soon resolved however as Greville was named as captain for Derrytresk for their short lived 2020 Championship campaign were they lost in the first round on a penalty shoot-out, Greville failed to convert in said shoot-out.
The beginning of his second season was met with controversy also. At the annual committee meeting, usually held shortly before the upcoming season, Greville was accused of taking a performance-enhancing substance a claim which he denied profusely. This lead Greville to demand a transfer to neighbours Derrylaughan Kevin Barrys GAC. The issue was solved very publicly with members of the Derrytresk committee apologising to Greville at a former player's wedding. Greville again started at centre-forward in their unsuccessful opening 2021 Tyrone Junior Championship fixture vs Drumragh Sarsfields GAC

Greville also signed for Naomh Colum Cille, a hurling team in Tyrone and won the 2021 Tyrone Junior Hurling Championship scoring 0-4 from play in the final vs Omagh St Enda's GAA

Outside of GAA
On 3 May 2011, Greville was arrested following the death of a young woman by dangerous driving in Mullingar. He was the driver of a car that collided with a wall, killing one of the passengers, a 22-year-old woman, having been driving at 112.8 km/h (70.1 mph) in wet conditions in a 50 km/h (30 mph) zone, with a blood alcohol level of 0.93 mg per millilitre of blood. He faced 21 months in prison when sentenced in February 2016, but his punishment was changed to a €61,000 fine and a driving ban of three years and four months, which had already been spent.

References

Year of birth missing (living people)
Living people
Dual players
Westmeath inter-county Gaelic footballers
Killucan Gaelic footballers
Westmeath inter-county hurlers
Raharney hurlers